Reggie Johnson may refer to:

 Reggie Johnson (musician) (1940–2020), American jazz double bassist
 Reggie Johnson (basketball, born 1957), American basketball player for the University of Tennessee
 Reggie Johnson (boxer) (born 1966), American boxer
 Reggie Johnson (American football) (born 1968), American football player
 Reggie Johnson (basketball, born 1989), American basketball player for the University of Miami